Uffing am Staffelsee station is a railway station in the municipality of Uffing am Staffelsee, in Bavaria, Germany. It is located on the Munich–Garmisch-Partenkirchen railway of Deutsche Bahn.

Services
 the following services stop at Uffing am Staffelsee:

References

External links
 
 Uffing am Staffelsee layout 
 

Railway stations in Bavaria
Buildings and structures in Garmisch-Partenkirchen (district)